The Gadsden Purchase ( "The Sale of La Mesilla") is a  region of present-day southern Arizona and southwestern New Mexico that the United States acquired from Mexico by the Treaty of Mesilla, which took effect on June 8, 1854. The purchase included lands south of the Gila River and west of the Rio Grande where the U.S. wanted to build a transcontinental railroad along a deep southern route, which the Southern Pacific Railroad later completed in 1881–1883. The purchase also aimed to resolve other border issues.

The first draft was signed on December 30, 1853, by James Gadsden, U.S. ambassador to Mexico, and by Antonio López de Santa Anna, president of Mexico. The U.S. Senate voted in favor of ratifying it with amendments on April 25, 1854, and then sent it to President Franklin Pierce. Mexico's government and its General Congress or Congress of the Union took final approval action on June 8, 1854, when the treaty took effect. The purchase was the last substantial territorial acquisition in the contiguous United States, and defined the Mexico–United States border. The Arizona cities of Tucson and Yuma are on territory acquired by the U.S. in the Gadsden Purchase. 

The financially strapped government of Santa Anna agreed to the sale, which netted Mexico $10 million
(equivalent to $ in ). After the devastating loss of Mexican territory to the U.S. in the Mexican–American War (1846–48) and the continued unauthorized military expeditions in the zone led by New Mexico territorial governor and noted filibuster William Carr Lane, some historians argue that Santa Anna may have calculated it was better to yield territory by treaty and receive payment rather than have the territory simply seized by the U.S.

Desire for a southern transcontinental rail line 

As the railroad age evolved, business-oriented Southerners saw that a railroad linking the South with the Pacific Coast would expand trade opportunities. They thought the topography of the southern portion of the original boundary line was too mountainous to allow a direct route. Projected southern railroad routes tended to veer to the north as they proceeded eastward, which would favor connections with northern railroads and ultimately favor northern seaports. Southerners saw that to avoid the mountains, a route with a southeastern terminus might need to swing south into what was still Mexican territory.

The administration of President Pierce, strongly influenced by Secretary of War Jefferson Davis, saw an opportunity to acquire land for the railroad, as well as to acquire significant other territory from northern Mexico. In those years, the debate over slavery in the United States entered into many other debates, as the acquisition of new territory opened the question of whether it would be slave or free territory; in this case, the debate over slavery ended progress on construction of a southern transcontinental rail line until the early 1880s, although the preferred land became part of the nation and was used as intended after the Civil War.

Southern route for the Transcontinental Railroad

Southern commercial conventions 
 In January 1845, Asa Whitney of New York presented the United States Congress with the first plan to construct a transcontinental railroad. Although Congress took no action on his proposal, a commercial convention of 1845 in Memphis took up the issue. Prominent attendees included John C. Calhoun, Clement C. Clay, Sr., John Bell, William Gwin, and Edmund P. Gaines, but  James Gadsden of South Carolina was influential in the convention's recommending a southern route for the proposed railroad. The route was to begin in Texas and end in San Diego or Mazatlán. Southerners hoped that such a route would ensure Southern prosperity, while opening the "West to southern influence and settlement".

Southern interest in railroads in general, and the Pacific railroad in particular, accelerated after the conclusion of the Mexican–American War in 1848. During that war, topographical officers William H. Emory and James W. Abert had conducted surveys that demonstrated the feasibility of a railroad's originating in El Paso or western Arkansas and ending in San Diego. J. D. B. DeBow, the editor of DeBow's Review, and Gadsden both publicized within the South the benefits of building this railroad.

Gadsden had become the president of the South Carolina Canal and Rail Road Company in 1839; about a decade later, the company had laid  of track extending west from Charleston, South Carolina, and was $3 million (equivalent to $ in ) in debt. Gadsden wanted to connect all Southern railroads into one sectional network. He was concerned that the increasing railroad construction in the North was shifting trade in lumber, farm and manufacturing goods from the traditional north–south route based on the Ohio and Mississippi rivers to an east–west axis that would bypass the South. He also saw Charleston, his home town, losing its prominence as a seaport. In addition, many Southern business interests feared that a northern transcontinental route would exclude the South from trade with the Orient. Other Southerners argued for diversification from a plantation economy to keep the South independent of northern bankers.

In October 1849, the southern interests held a convention to discuss railroads in Memphis, in response to a convention in St. Louis earlier that fall which discussed a northern route. The Memphis convention overwhelmingly advocated the construction of a route beginning there, to connect with an El Paso, Texas to San Diego, California line. Disagreement arose only over the issue of financing. The convention president, Matthew Fontaine Maury of Virginia, preferred strict private financing, whereas John Bell and others thought that federal land grants to railroad developers would be necessary.

James Gadsden and California 
Gadsden supported nullification in 1831. When California was admitted to the Union as a free state in 1850, he advocated secession by South Carolina. Gadsden considered slavery "a social blessing" and abolitionists "the greatest curse of the nation".

When the secession proposal failed, Gadsden worked with his cousin Isaac Edward Holmes, a lawyer in San Francisco since 1851, and California state senator Thomas Jefferson Green, in an attempt to divide California into northern and southern portions and proposed that the southern part allow slavery. Gadsden planned to establish a slave-holding colony there based on rice, cotton, and sugar, and wanted to use slave labor to build a railroad and highway that originated in either San Antonio or the Red River valley. The railway or highway would transport people to the California gold fields. Toward this end, on December 31, 1851, Gadsden asked Green to secure from the California state legislature a large land grant located between the 34th and 36th parallels, along the proposed dividing line for the two California states.

A few months later, Gadsden and 1,200 potential settlers from South Carolina and Florida submitted a petition to the California legislature for permanent citizenship and permission to establish a rural district that would be farmed by "not less than Two Thousand of their African Domestics". The petition stimulated some debate, but it finally died in committee.

Stephen Douglas and land grants 
The Compromise of 1850, which created the Utah Territory and the New Mexico Territory, would facilitate a southern route to the West Coast since all territory for the railroad was now organized and would allow for federal land grants as a financing measure. Competing northern or central routes championed, respectively, by U.S. Senators Stephen Douglas of Illinois and Thomas Hart Benton of Missouri, would still need to go through unorganized territories. Millard Fillmore established a precedent for using federal land grants when he signed a bill promoted by Douglas that allowed a south to north, Mobile to Chicago railroad to be financed by "federal land grants for the specific purpose of railroad construction". To satisfy Southern opposition to the general principle of federally supported internal improvements, the land grants would first be transferred to the appropriate state or territorial government, which would oversee the final transfer to private developers.

By 1850, however, the majority of the South was not interested in exploiting its advantages in developing a transcontinental railroad or railroads in general. Businessmen like Gadsden, who advocated economic diversification, were in the minority. The Southern economy was based on cotton exports, and then-current transportation networks met the plantation system's needs. There was little home market for an intra-South trade. In the short term, the best use for capital was to invest it in more slaves and land rather than in taxing it to support canals, railroads, roads, or in dredging rivers. Historian Jere W. Roberson wrote:

Treaty of Guadalupe Hidalgo 

The Treaty of Guadalupe Hidalgo (1848) ended the Mexican–American War, but left issues affecting both sides that still needed to be resolved: possession of the Mesilla Valley, protection for Mexico from Indian raids, and the right of transit in the Isthmus of Tehuantepec.

Mesilla Valley 
The treaty provided for a joint commission, made up of a surveyor and commissioner from each country, to determine the final boundary between the United States and Mexico. The treaty specified that the Rio Grande Boundary would veer west eight miles (13 km) north of El Paso. The treaty was based on the attached 1847 copy of a twenty-five-year-old map. Surveys revealed that El Paso was  further south and  further west than the map showed. Mexico favored the map, but the United States put faith in the results of the survey. The disputed territory involved a few thousand square miles and about 3,000 residents; more significantly, it included the Mesilla Valley. This valley was essential for the construction of a transcontinental railroad using a southern route.

John Bartlett of Rhode Island, the United States negotiator, agreed to allow Mexico to retain the Mesilla Valley (setting the boundary at 32° 22′ N, north of the American claim 31° 52′ and at the easternmost part, also north of the Mexican-claimed boundary at 32° 15′) in exchange for a boundary that did not turn north until 110° W in order to include the Santa Rita Mountains, which were believed to have rich copper deposits, and some silver and gold which had not yet been mined. Southerners opposed this alternative because of its implication for the railroad, but President Fillmore supported it. Southerners in Congress prevented any action on the approval of this separate border treaty and eliminated further funding to survey the disputed borderland. Robert B. Campbell, a pro-railroad politician from Alabama, later replaced Bartlett. Mexico asserted that the commissioners' determinations were valid and prepared to send in troops to enforce the unratified agreement.

Native American raids 

Article XI of the Treaty of Guadalupe Hidalgo contained a guarantee that the United States would protect Mexicans by preventing cross-border raids by local Comanche and Apache tribes. At the time the treaty was ratified, Secretary of State James Buchanan had believed that the United States had both the commitment and resources to enforce this promise. Historian Richard Kluger, however, described the difficulties of the task:

In the five years after approval of the Treaty, the United States spent $12 million (equivalent to $ in ) in this area, and General-in-Chief Winfield Scott estimated that five times that amount would be necessary to police the border. Mexican officials, frustrated with the failure of the United States to effectively enforce its guarantee, demanded reparations for the losses inflicted on Mexican citizens by the raids. The United States argued that the Treaty did not require any compensation nor did it require any greater effort to protect Mexicans than was expended in protecting its own citizens. During the Fillmore administration, Mexico claimed damages of $40 million (equivalent to $ in ) but offered to allow the U.S. to buy-out Article XI for $25 million ($) while President Fillmore proposed a settlement that was $10 million less ($).

Isthmus of Tehuantepec 
During negotiations of the treaty, Americans had failed to secure the right of transit across the  Isthmus of Tehuantepec in southern Mexico. The idea of building a railroad here had been considered for a long time, connecting the Gulf of Mexico with the Pacific Ocean. In 1842 Mexican President Antonio López de Santa Anna sold the rights to build a railroad or canal across the isthmus. In 1847 a British bank bought the rights, raising U.S. fears of British colonization in the hemisphere, in violation of the precepts of the Monroe Doctrine. United States interest in the right-of-way increased in 1848 after the gold strikes in the Sierra Nevada, which led to the California Gold Rush.

The Memphis commercial convention of 1849 recommended that the United States pursue the trans-isthmus route, since it appeared unlikely that a transcontinental railroad would be built anytime soon. Interests in Louisiana were especially adamant about this option, as they believed that any transcontinental railroad would divert commercial traffic away from the Mississippi and New Orleans, and they at least wanted to secure a southern route. Also showing interest was Peter A. Hargous of New York who ran an import-export business between New York and Vera Cruz. Hargous purchased the rights to the route for $25,000 (equivalent to $ in ), but realized that the grant had little value unless it was supported by the Mexican and American governments.

In Mexico, topographical officer George W. Hughes reported to Secretary of State John M. Clayton that a railroad across the isthmus was a "feasible and practical" idea. Clayton then instructed Robert P. Letcher, the minister to Mexico, to negotiate a treaty to protect Hargous' rights. The United States' proposal gave Mexicans a 20% discount on shipping, guaranteed Mexican rights in the zone, allowed the United States to send in military if necessary, and gave the United States most-favored-nation status for Mexican cargo fees. This treaty, however, was never finalized.

The Clayton–Bulwer Treaty between the United States and the United Kingdom, which guaranteed the neutrality of any such canal, was finalized in April 1850. Mexican negotiators refused the treaty because it would eliminate Mexico's ability to play the US and Britain against each other. They eliminated the right of the United States to unilaterally intervene militarily. The United States Senate approved the treaty in early 1851, but the Mexican Congress refused to accept the treaty.

In the meantime, Hargous proceeded as if the treaty would be approved eventually. Judah P. Benjamin and a committee of New Orleans businessmen joined with Hargous and secured a charter from the Louisiana legislature to create the Tehuantepec Railroad Company. The new company sold stock and sent survey teams to Mexico. Hargous started to acquire land even after the Mexican legislature rejected the treaty, a move that led to the Mexicans canceling Hargous' contract to use the right of way. Hargous put his losses at $5 million (equivalent to $ in ) and asked the United States government to intervene. President Fillmore refused to do so.

Mexico sold the canal franchise, without the land grants, to A. G. Sloo and Associates in New York for $600,000 (equivalent to $ in ). In March 1853 Sloo contracted with a British company to build a railroad and sought an exclusive contract from the new Franklin Pierce Administration to deliver mail from New York to San Francisco. However, Sloo soon defaulted on bank loans and the contract was sold back to Hargous.

Final negotiations and ratification of the treaty of purchase 
The Pierce administration, which took office in March 1853, had a strong pro-southern, pro-expansion mindset. It sent Louisiana Senator Pierre Soulé to Spain to negotiate the acquisition of Cuba. Pierce appointed expansionists John Y. Mason of Virginia and Solon Borland of Arkansas as ministers, respectively, to France and Nicaragua. Pierce's Secretary of War, Jefferson Davis, was already on record as favoring a southern route for a transcontinental railroad, so southern rail enthusiasts had every reason to be encouraged.

The South as a whole, however, remained divided. In January 1853, Senator Thomas Jefferson Rusk of Texas introduced a bill to create two railroads, one with a northern route, and one with a southern route starting below Memphis on the Mississippi River. Under the Rusk legislation, the President would be authorized to select the specific termini and routes as well as the contractors who would build the railroads. Some southerners, however, worried that northern and central interests would leap ahead in construction and opposed any direct aid to private developers on constitutional grounds. Other southerners preferred the isthmian proposals. An amendment was added to the Rusk bill to prohibit direct aid, but southerners still split their vote in Congress and the amendment failed.

This rejection led to legislative demands, sponsored by William Gwin of California and Salmon P. Chase of Ohio and supported by the railroad interests, for new surveys for possible routes. Gwin expected that a southern route would be approved—both Davis and Robert J. Walker, former Secretary of the Treasury, supported it. Both were stockholders in a Vicksburg-based railroad that planned to build a link to Texas to join up with the southern route. Davis argued that the southern route would have an important military application in the likely event of future troubles with Mexico.

Gadsden and Santa Anna 

A treaty initiated in the Fillmore administration that would provide joint Mexican and United States protection for the Sloo grant was signed in Mexico on March 21, 1853. At the same time that this treaty was received in Washington, Pierce learned that New Mexico Territorial Governor William C. Lane had issued a proclamation claiming the Mesilla Valley as part of New Mexico, leading to protests from Mexico. Pierce was also aware of efforts by France, through its consul in San Francisco, to acquire the Mexican state of Sonora.

Pierce recalled Lane in May and replaced him with David Meriwether of Kentucky. Meriwether was given orders to stay out of the Mesilla Valley until negotiations with Mexico could be completed. With the encouragement of Davis, Pierce also appointed James Gadsden as ambassador to Mexico, with specific instructions to negotiate with Mexico over the acquisition of additional territory. Secretary of State William L. Marcy gave Gadsden clear instructions: he was to secure the Mesilla Valley for the purposes of building a railroad through it, convince Mexico that the US had done its best regarding the Indian raids, and elicit Mexican cooperation in efforts by US citizens to build a canal or railroad across the Isthmus of Tehuantepec. Supporting the Sloo interests was not part of the instructions. Gadsden met with Santa Anna in Mexico City on September 25, 1853, to discuss the terms of the treaty.

The Mexican government was going through political and financial turmoil. In the process, Santa Anna had been returned to power about the same time that Pierce was inaugurated. Santa Anna was willing to deal with the United States because he needed money to rebuild the Mexican Army for defense against the United States. He initially rejected the extension of the border further south to the Sierra Madre Mountains. He initially insisted on reparations for the damages caused by American Indian raids, but agreed to let an international tribunal resolve this. Gadsden realized that Santa Anna needed money and passed this information along to Secretary Marcy.

Marcy and Pierce responded with new instructions. Gadsden was authorized to purchase any of six parcels of land with a price fixed for each.

"Gadsden's antagonistic manner" alienated Santa Anna. Gadsden had advised Santa Anna that "the spirit of the age" would soon lead the northern Mexican states to secede so he might as well sell them now. Mexico balked at any large-scale sale of territory. The Mexican President felt threatened by William Walker's attempt to capture Baja California with 50 troops and annex Sonora. Gadsden disavowed any government backing of Walker, who retreated to the U.S. and was placed on trial as a criminal. Santa Anna worried that the US would allow further aggression against Mexican territory. Santa Anna needed to get as much money for as little territory as possible. When the United Kingdom rejected Mexican requests to assist in the negotiations, Santa Anna opted for the $15 million package (equivalent to $ in ).

Santa Anna signed the treaty on December 30, 1853, along with James Gadsden. Then the treaty was presented to the U.S. Senate for confirmation.

Ratification 

Pierce and his cabinet began debating the treaty in January 1854. Although disappointed in the amount of territory secured and some of the terms, Pierce signed it, and submitted it to the Senate on February 10. Gadsden, however, suggested that northern Senators would block the treaty to deny the South a railroad.

The treaty needed a two-thirds vote in favor of ratification in the US Senate, where it met strong opposition. Anti-slavery senators opposed further acquisition of slave territory. Lobbying by speculators gave the treaty a bad reputation. Some Senators objected to furnishing Santa Anna financial assistance.

The treaty reached the Senate as that body focused on the debate over the Kansas–Nebraska Act. On April 17, after much debate, the Senate voted 27 to 18 in favor of the treaty, falling three votes short of the necessary two-thirds majority. After this defeat, Secretary Davis and southern Senators pressed Pierce to add more provisions to the treaty including:
 protection for the Sloo grant;
 a requirement that Mexico "protect with its whole power the prosecution, preservation, and security of the work [referring to the isthmian canal]";
 permission for the United States to intervene unilaterally "when it may feel sanctioned and warranted by the public or international law"; and

The land area included in the treaty is shown in the map at the head of the article, and in the national map in this section.

This version of the treaty successfully passed the US Senate April 25, 1854, by a vote of 33 to 12. The reduction in territory was an accommodation of northern senators who opposed the acquisition of additional slave territory. In the final vote, northerners split 12 to 12. Gadsden took the revised treaty back to Santa Anna, who accepted the changes. The treaty went into effect June 30, 1854.

While the land was available for construction of a southern railroad, the issue had become too strongly associated with the sectional debate over slavery to receive federal funding. Roberson wrote:

The effect was such that railroad development, which accelerated in the North, stagnated in the South.

Post-ratification controversy 
As originally envisioned, the purchase would have encompassed a much larger region, extending far enough south to include most of the current Mexican states of Baja California, Baja California Sur, Coahuila, Chihuahua, Sonora, Nuevo León, and Tamaulipas. The Mexican people opposed such boundaries, as did anti-slavery Americans, who saw the purchase as acquisition of more slave territory. Even the sale of a relatively small strip of land angered the Mexican people, who saw Santa Anna's actions as a betrayal of their country. They watched in dismay as he squandered the funds generated by the Purchase. Contemporary Mexican historians continue to view the deal negatively and believe that it has defined the American–Mexican relationship in a deleterious way.

The purchased lands were initially appended to the existing New Mexico Territory. To help control the new land, the US Army established Fort Buchanan on Sonoita Creek in present-day southern Arizona on November 17, 1856. The difficulty of governing the new areas from the territorial capital at Santa Fe led to efforts as early as 1856 to organize a new territory out of the southern portion. Many of the early settlers in the region were, however, pro-slavery and sympathetic to the South, resulting in an impasse in Congress as to how best to reorganize the territory.

The shifting of the course of the Rio Grande would cause a later dispute over the boundary between Purchase lands and those of the state of Texas, known as the Country Club Dispute. Pursuant to the Treaty of Guadalupe Hidalgo, the Gadsden Treaty and subsequent treaties, the International Boundary and Water Commission was established in 1889 to maintain the border. Pursuant to still later treaties, the IBWC expanded its duties to allocation of river waters between the two nations, and provided for flood control and water sanitation. Once viewed as a model of international cooperation, in recent decades the IBWC has been heavily criticized as an institutional anachronism, by-passed by modern social, environmental, and political issues.

Growth of the region after 1854

Army control 
The residents of the area gained full US citizenship and slowly assimilated into American life over the next half-century. The principal threat to the peace and security of settlers and travelers in the area was raids by Apache Indians. The US Army took control of the purchase lands in 1854 but not until 1856 were troops stationed in the troubled region. In June 1857 it established Fort Buchanan south of the Gila at the head of the Sonoita Creek Valley. The fort protected the area until it was evacuated and destroyed in July 1861. The new stability brought miners and ranchers. By the late 1850s mining camps and military posts had not only transformed the Arizona countryside; they had also generated new trade linkages to the state of Sonora, Mexico. Magdalena, Sonora, became a supply center for Tubac; wheat from nearby Cucurpe fed the troops at Fort Buchanan; and the town of Santa Cruz sustained the Mowry mines, just miles to the north.

Civil War 
In 1861, during the American Civil War, the Confederate States of America formed the Confederate Territory of Arizona, including in the new territory mainly areas acquired by the Gadsden Purchase. In 1863, using a north-to-south dividing line, the Union created its own Arizona Territory out of the western half of the New Mexico Territory. The new American Arizona Territory also included most of the lands acquired in the Gadsden Purchase. This territory would be admitted into the Union as the State of Arizona on February 14, 1912, the last area of the Lower 48 States to receive statehood.

Social development 
After the Gadsden Purchase, southern Arizona's social elite, including the Estevan Ochoa, Mariano Samaniego, and Leopoldo Carillo families, remained primarily Mexican American until the coming of the railroad in the 1880s. When the Sonora Exploring and Mining Company opened silver mines in southern Arizona, it sought to employ educated, middle-class Americans who shared a work ethic and leadership abilities to operate the mines. A biographical analysis of some 200 of its employees, classed as capitalists, managers, laborers, and general service personnel, reveals that the resulting work force included Europeans, Americans, Mexicans, and Indians. This mixture failed to stabilize the remote area, which lacked formal social, political, and economic organization in the years from the Gadsden Purchase to the Civil War.

Economic development 
From the late 1840s into the 1870s, Texas stockmen drove their beef cattle through southern Arizona on the Texas–California trail. Texans were impressed with the grazing possibilities offered by the Gadsden Purchase country of Arizona. In the last third of the century, they moved their herds into Arizona and established the range cattle industry there. The Texans contributed their proven range methods to the new grass country of Arizona, but also brought their problems as well. Texas rustlers brought lawlessness, poor management resulted in overstocking, and carelessness introduced destructive diseases. But these difficulties did force laws and associations in Arizona to curb and resolve them. The Anglo-American cattleman frontier in Arizona was an extension of the Texas experience.

When the Arizona Territory was formed in 1863 from the southern portion of the New Mexico Territory, Pima County and later Cochise County—created from the easternmost portion of Pima County in January 1881—were subject to ongoing border-related conflicts. The area was characterized by rapidly growing boom towns, ongoing Apache raids, smuggling and cattle rustling across the United States-Mexico border, growing ranching operations, and the expansion of new technologies in mining, railroading, and telecommunications.

In the 1860s conflict between the Apaches and the Americans was at its height. Until 1886, almost constant warfare existed in the region adjacent to the Mexican border. The illegal cattle operations kept beef prices in the border region lower and provided cheap stock that helped small ranchers get by. Many early Tombstone, Arizona residents looked the other way when it was "only Mexicans" being robbed.

Outlaws derisively called "The Cowboys" frequently robbed stagecoaches and brazenly stole cattle in broad daylight, scaring off the legitimate cowboys watching the herds. Bandits used the border between the United States and Mexico to raid across in one direction and take sanctuary in the other. In December 1878, and again the next year, Mexican authorities complained about the "Cowboy" outlaws who stole Mexican beef and resold it in Arizona. The Arizona Citizen reported that both U.S. and Mexican bandits were stealing horses from the Santa Cruz Valley and selling them in Sonora. Arizona Territorial Governor Frémont investigated the Mexican government's allegations and accused them in turn of allowing outlaws to use Sonora as a base of operations for raiding into Arizona.

In the 1870s and 1880s there was considerable tension in the region—between the rural residents, who were for the most part Democrats from the agricultural South, and town residents and business owners, who were largely Republicans from the industrial Northeast and Midwest. The tension culminated in what has been called the Cochise County feud, and the Earp-Clanton feud, which ended with the historic Gunfight at the O.K. Corral and Wyatt Earp's Vendetta Ride.

The Gadsden purchase resulted in the division of the Tohono Oʼodham Nation and its ancestral lands by the new international border. This disrupted traditional migratory practices and transportation of materials and goods essential for their spirituality, economy and traditional culture. Nine communities are on the Mexican side of this boundary. Conflicts have arisen mainly in the 21st century with stronger enforcement of customs laws at the border.

Railroad development 

In 1846, James Gadsden, then president of the South Carolina Railroad, proposed building a transcontinental railroad linking the Atlantic at Charleston with the Pacific at San Diego. Federal and private surveys by Lt. John G. Parke and Andrew B Gray proved the feasibility of the southern transcontinental route, but sectional strife and the Civil War delayed construction of the proposed railroad. The Southern Pacific Railroad from Los Angeles reached Yuma, Arizona, in 1877, Tucson, Arizona in March 1880, Deming, New Mexico in December 1880, and El Paso in May 1881, the first railroad across the Gadsden Purchase.

At the same time, 1879–1881, the Atchison, Topeka and Santa Fe Railroad was building across New Mexico and met the Southern Pacific at Deming, New Mexico March 7, 1881, completing the second transcontinental railroad (the first, the central transcontinental, was completed May 10, 1869 at Promontory Summit, Utah). Acquiring trackage rights over the SP, from Deming to Benson, the Santa Fe then built a line southwest to Guaymas, Sonora, Mexico, completed October 1882, as its first outlet to the Pacific. This line was later sold to the Southern Pacific. The Southern Pacific continued building east from El Paso, completing a junction with the Texas & Pacific in December 1881, and finally in 1883, its own southern transcontinental, the Sunset Route, California to New Orleans, Atlantic waters to the Pacific. These railroads caused an early 1880s mining boom in such locales as Tombstone, Arizona, Bisbee, Arizona, and Santa Rita, New Mexico, the latter two world class copper producers. From Bisbee, a third sub-transcontinental was built across the Gadsden Purchase, the El Paso and Southwestern Railroad, to El Paso by 1905, then to a link with the Rock Island line to form the Golden State Route. The EP&SW was sold to the Southern Pacific in the early 1920s.

The portion of the Southern Pacific in Arizona was originally largely in the Gadsden Purchase but the western part was later rerouted north of the Gila River to serve the city of Phoenix (as part of the agreement in purchasing the EP&SW). The portion in New Mexico runs largely through the territory that had been disputed between Mexico and the United States after the Treaty of Guadalupe Hidalgo had gone into effect, and before the time of the Gadsden Purchase. The Santa Fe Railroad Company also completed a railroad across Northern Arizona, via Holbrook, Winslow, Flagstaff and Kingman in August 1883. These two transcontinental railroads, the Southern Pacific (now part of the Union Pacific Railroad) and the Santa Fe (now part of the BNSF), are among the busiest rail lines in the United States.

During the early twentieth century, a number of short-lines usually associated with mining booms were built in the Gadsden Purchase to Ajo, Silverbell, Twin Buttes, Courtland, Gleeson, Arizona, Shakespeare, New Mexico, and other mine sites. Most of these railroads have been abandoned.

The remainder of the Gila Valley pre-Purchase border area was traversed by the Arizona Eastern Railway by 1899 and the Copper Basin Railway by 1904. Excluded was a  section  in the San Carlos Apache Indian Reservation, from today's San Carlos Lake to Winkelman at the mouth of the San Pedro River, including the Needle's Eye Wilderness. This highway is well north of the Gadsden Purchase. Given the elevations of those three places, at least a 3% grade would have been required for rails built here, rather than the final alignment; railroads prefer 1% or less grade for better operation. This rugged terrain above the Gila River confirms the engineering, technical wisdom of acquiring the Gadsden Purchase for a southern transcontinental railroad. To William H. Emory of the U. S. Army Corps of Topographical Engineers who surveyed the region in the 1840s–1850s, it was a good route "to the Pacific."

Population

Arizona 
The boundaries of most counties in Arizona do not follow the northern boundary of the Gadsden Purchase, but six counties in Arizona do have most of their populations within the land of the Gadsden Purchase. Four of these also contain areas north of the Gadsden Purchase, but these areas have low population densities, with the exception of northeastern Pinal County including the towns of Apache Junction and Florence. Maricopa County also extends south into the area of the Gadsden Purchase, but this area is also thinly populated. Tucson is the largest city in the Gadsden Purchase.

New Mexico 
Sunland Park (population 14,267 in 2010), a suburb of El Paso, Texas, in Doña Ana County, New Mexico, is the largest community of New Mexico in the Gadsden Purchase.

Lordsburg, New Mexico (population 2,797 in 2010), the county seat of Hidalgo County, was in the disputed area before the Gadsden Purchase, and Deming, New Mexico, the county seat of Luna County, was north of both the Mexican and American land claims before the Gadsden Purchase, though the proposed Bartlett–Conde compromise of 1851 would have left Deming in Mexico, or stated in positive terms, the negotiations for the Gadsden Purchase resolved the border disputes with Mexico, as well as transferred this land to the U.S.

Cost effectiveness 
Geologist Harold L. James stated in 1969 about the Gadsden Purchase: "Although the boundary controversy did not teach any lessons or impart any wisdom, it did lead to the purchase of an extremely valuable strip of territory that has more than paid for itself in subsequent mineral and agricultural resources. Despite the comedy of errors, chaos, and misunderstanding, the Southwest must therefore be grateful."

However, economist David R. Barker estimated in 2009 that the purchase was likely not profitable for the United States federal government. Stating that "Current historical accounts take it for granted that the purchase has been a boon to the United States", he calculated that the region produces little tax revenue; most mines are on Indian reservations which receive all royalties. The federal government spent a great deal of money during the 19th century to defend the territory from Apaches that would not have been necessary without the purchase.

In popular culture 
The consequences of the Gadsden Purchase for Mexicans and Native Americans living in the region form the background of the story in the film Conquest of Cochise (Columbia, 1953).

The United States Post Office Department issued a postage stamp commemorating 100 years since the Gadsden Purchase, on December 30, 1953.

In 2012, the Gadsden Purchase was featured in a segment on Late Night with Jimmy Fallon.

A supporting character in the 2021 novel Billy Summers by Stephen King is named "Gadsden Drake" after the Gadsden Purchase.

See also 

 Butterfield Overland Mail
 Gadsden Purchase half dollar
 Historic regions of the United States
 Mexico–United States border
 Republic of Sonora

Notes

References

Bibliography

Further reading 

  stresses railroad speculation and corruption themes

External links 
 US Geological Survey USGS Public Lands Survey Map including survey township (6 mile) lines.
 Map of proposed Arizona Territory. From explorations by A. B. Gray & others, to accompany memoir by Lieut. Mowry U.S. Army, Delegate elect. with some proposed railroad routes Medium-sized JPG Zoom navigator
 National Park Service Map including route of the Southern Pacific railroad finally built in the 1880s.
 Gadsden Purchase, 1853–1854, Office of the Historian, US Department of State
 3-cent commemorative stamp showing small version of northeast boundary of Purchasei.e. claiming more territory for US pre-Purchase.
 
 Map of North America at the time of the Gadsden Purchase at omniatlas.com

1853 treaties
History of the Southwestern United States
History of the American West
1853 in Mexico
1853 in the United States
History of United States expansionism
Independent Mexico
Mexico–United States border
New Mexico Territory
Pre-statehood history of Arizona
Treaties involving territorial changes
Presidency of Franklin Pierce
Purchased territories